Valle Vista may refer to the following places in the United States:

Valle Vista, Arizona
Valle Vista, California, in Riverside County
Valle Vista, New Mexico
Valle Vista, Texas